Isabel Wilkerson (born 1961) is an American journalist and the author of The Warmth of Other Suns: The Epic Story of America's Great Migration (2010) and Caste: The Origins of Our Discontents (2020). She is the first woman of African-American heritage to win the Pulitzer Prize in journalism.

Wilkerson was the editor-in-chief of the Howard University college newspaper, interned at the Los Angeles Times and Washington Post, and became the Chicago Bureau Chief of The New York Times. She also taught at Emory, Princeton, Northwestern, and Boston University.

Wilkerson interviewed over a thousand people for The Warmth of Other Suns, which documents the stories of African Americans who migrated to northern and western cities during the 20th century. Her book Caste identifies the racial hierarchy in the United States as a caste system. Both books were best-sellers.

Early life and education
Isabel Wilkerson was born in Washington, D.C. in 1961 to parents who left Virginia during the Great Migration. Her father was one of the Tuskegee Airmen during World War II and became a bridge engineer after the war.<ref>{{Cite magazine|title=Racism' Did Not Seem Sufficient.' Author Isabel Wilkerson on the American Caste System|url=https://time.com/5870485/isabel-wilkerson-caste/|access-date=2020-11-18|magazine=Time|date=July 23, 2020 }}</ref>

Wilkerson studied journalism at Howard University, becoming editor-in-chief of the college newspaper The Hilltop. During college, she interned at publications including the Los Angeles Times and The Washington Post.

 Career 
In 1994, while the Chicago Bureau Chief of The New York Times, she became the first woman of African-American heritage to win the Pulitzer Prize in journalism, winning the feature writing award for her coverage of the 1993 midwestern floods and her profile of a 10-year-old boy who was responsible for his four siblings. Several of Wilkerson's articles are included in the book Pulitzer Prize Feature Stories: America's Best Writing, 1979 - 2003, edited by David Garlock.

She has also been the James M. Cox Professor of Journalism at Emory University, Ferris Professor of Journalism at Princeton University and the Kreeger-Wolf endowed lecturer at Northwestern University and Professor of Journalism and Director of Narrative Nonfiction at Boston University's College of Communication. She also served as a board member of the National Arts in Journalism Program at Columbia University.

After fifteen years of research and writing, she published The Warmth of Other Suns: The Epic Story of America's Great Migration in 2010, which examines the three geographic routes that were commonly used by African Americans leaving the southern states between 1915 and the 1970s, illustrated through the personal stories of people who took those routes. During her research for the book, Wilkerson interviewed more than 1,000 people who made the migration from the South to Northern and Western cities. The book almost instantly hit number 5 on the New York Times Bestseller list for nonfiction and has since been included in lists of best books of 2010 by many reviewers, including The New York Times, The Los Angeles Times, The New Yorker, Amazon.com, Salon.com, The Washington Post, The Economist, Atlanta Magazine and The Daily Beast. In March 2011 the book won the National Book Critics Circle Award (Nonfiction). The book also won the Anisfield-Wolf Award for Nonfiction, the Mark Lynton History Prize, the Sidney Hillman Book Prize, the Heartland Prize for Nonfiction and was also the nonfiction runner-up for the Dayton Literary Peace Prize in 2011.

In a 2010 New York Times interview, Wilkerson described herself as being part of a movement of African Americans who have chosen to return to the South after generations in the North.

Wilkerson's book Caste: The Origins of Our Discontents argues that racial stratification in the United States is best understood as a caste system, akin to those in India and in Nazi Germany.
A 2020 review in The New York Times described it as "an instant American classic and almost certainly the keynote nonfiction book of the American century thus far." Publishers Weekly called Caste a “powerful and extraordinarily timely social history.”The Chicago Tribune wrote that the book was "among the year’s best" books. The book peaked at number one on The New York Times nonfiction best-seller list. On October 14, 2020, Netflix announced Ava DuVernay will write, direct, and produce a feature film adaptation of Caste.Bibliography

Books
 The Warmth of Other Suns: The Epic Story of America's Great Migration (Random House, 2010). 
 Caste: The Origins of Our Discontents (Random House, 2020). 

Essays, columns and lectures
 The New American Reader: Recent Periodical Essays, edited by Gilbert H. Muller (McGraw-Hill, 1997)
 "He Put a Spin on Design", in The Last Word: The New York Times Book of Obituaries and Farewells : a Celebration of Unusual Lives, edited by Marvin Siegel (William Morrow, 1997)
 "Superstars of Dreamland", in Best American Movie Writing, edited by George Plimpton (St. Martin's Press, 1998)
 We Americans: Celebrating a Nation, Its People and Its Past, edited by Thomas B. Allen and Charles O. Hyman (National Geographic Society, 1999)
 "Two Boys, a Debt, a Gun, a Victim: The Face of Violence", in Writing the World: Reading and Writing about Issues of the Day, edited by Charles R. Cooper, Susan Peck MacDonald (Macmillan, 2000). 
 Written into History: Pulitzer Prize Reporting of the Twentieth Century, edited by Anthony Lewis (Times Books, Henry Holt and Company, 2001)
 "First Born, Fast Grown: The Manful Life of Nicholas, 10", in Feature Writing for Newspapers and Magazines: The Pursuit of Excellence, edited by Edward Jay Friedlander and John Lee (HarperCollins College Publishers, 1997); and The Princeton Anthology of Writing, edited by John McPhee and Carol Rigolot (Princeton University Press, 2001)
 Various articles, Pulitzer Prize Feature Stories: America's Best Writing, 1979 - 2003, edited by David Garlock (Iowa State University Press, 1998; Wiley-Blackwell; 2nd edition, April 18, 2003)
 "Interviewing Sources", Spring 2002 Nieman Narrative Journalism Conference Report
 "Angela Whitiker's Climb", in Class Matters, by correspondents of The New York Times (Times Books, 2005)
 "Interviewing: Accelerated Intimacy", in Telling True Stories: A Nonfiction Writers' Guide from the Nieman Foundation at Harvard University, edited by Mark Kramer and Wendy Call (Plume Penguin Books, January 30, 2007)
 "America’s Enduring Caste System" (cover story of The New York Times Magazine, July 1, 2020)

Awards
 1993 George S. Polk Award for Regional Reporting, in The New York Times 1994 Pulitzer Prize in Journalism for Feature Writing
 1994 Journalist of the Year award from the National Association of Black Journalists
1998 Guggenheim Fellowship
 2010 National Book Critics Circle Award (Nonfiction), winner, The Warmth of Other Suns 2011 NAACP Image Award for Outstanding Literary Work Debut Author, nominated, The Warmth of Other Suns 2011 Anisfield-Wolf Book Award, winner, The Warmth of Other Suns2015 National Humanities Medal from the National Endowment for the Humanities
2020 Los Angeles Times Book Prize Current Interest winner, Caste 2022 Honorary Doctorate of Humane Letters from Smith College.

References

External links

 
 Isabel Wilkerson Tracks Exodus of Blacks from US South - video interview by Democracy Now! Time: Isabel Wilkerson on Black America's Immigration Story
 The Lives Gained by Fleeing Jim Crow By Janet Maslin, New York Times Book Review''

Pulitzer Prize for Feature Writing winners
The New York Times writers
Living people
Emory University faculty
George Polk Award recipients
Howard University alumni
1961 births
Journalists from Washington, D.C.
American women journalists
20th-century American journalists
20th-century American women writers
21st-century American journalists
21st-century American women writers
African-American writers
National Humanities Medal recipients
American women academics
20th-century African-American women
20th-century African-American people
21st-century African-American women
21st-century African-American people